NK3 homeobox 2 also known as NKX3-2  is a human gene. It is a homolog of bagpipe (bap) in Drosophila and therefore also known as Bapx1 (bagpipe homeobox homolog 1). The protein encoded by this gene is a homeodomain containing transcription factor.

Function
NKX3-2 plays a role in the development of the axial and limb skeleton. Mutations disrupting the function of this gene are associated with spondylo-megaepiphyseal-metaphyseal dysplasia (SMMD). Nkx3-2 in mice also regulates patterning in the middle ear. Two small bones in the middle ear, the malleus and incus, are homologous to the articular and quadrate, the bones of the proximal jaw joint in fish and other non-mammalian jawed vertebrates. NKX3-2 expression is required to pattern the articulated joint between these jaw bones, as knockdowns or knockouts of this gene result in the loss of the jaw joint in zebrafish, chicken, and amphibians. Overexpression of this gene results in the development of ectopic mandibular cartilages in zebrafish  and amphibians.

References

Further reading

External links 
 

Transcription factors